Ira Lonnie Loudermilk (April 21, 1924 – June 20, 1965), known professionally as Ira Louvin, was an American country music singer, mandolinist and songwriter. He was a cousin of songwriter John D. Loudermilk.

Biography
Ira Louvin was born in Section, Alabama and played together with his brother, Charlie, in the close harmony tradition as the Louvin Brothers. They were heavily influenced by the Delmore Brothers and Monroe Brothers. Ira played mandolin with Charlie Monroe, guitar player of the Monroe Brothers in the early 1940s. The Louvin Brothers' songs were heavily influenced by their Baptist faith and warned against sin.

Ira was notorious for his drinking and short temper. He married four times, his third wife having shot him multiple times in the chest and hand after he allegedly beat her. He died on June 20, 1965 when a drunken driver struck his car in Williamsburg, Missouri. At the time, a warrant for Louvin's arrest had been issued on a DUI charge.

References

External links

Artist Bio by Kim Summers @ AllMusic
Alabama Hall of Fame inductees – Louvin Brothers
Nashville Songwriters Hall of Fame inductee – Ira Louvin

The Louvin Brother's lives from 1927 to 1963, and Ira's brother Charlie's life to the present on Raised Country! 

1924 births
1965 deaths
Grand Ole Opry members
Road incident deaths in Missouri
American country singer-songwriters
American mandolinists
20th-century American singers
American country mandolinists
Country musicians from Alabama
Singer-songwriters from Alabama